The 1912 St. Louis Browns season involved the Browns finishing 7th in the American League with a record of 53 wins and 101 losses.

Regular season 
 July 4, 1912: George Mullin threw the first no-hitter in Detroit Tigers history against the Browns. The Tigers beat the Browns by a score of 7–0. It was also Mullin's 32nd birthday.

Season standings

Record vs. opponents

Roster

Player stats

Batting

Starters by position 
Note: Pos = Position; G = Games played; AB = At bats; H = Hits; Avg. = Batting average; HR = Home runs; RBI = Runs batted in

Other batters 
Note: G = Games played; AB = At bats; H = Hits; Avg. = Batting average; HR = Home runs; RBI = Runs batted in

Pitching

Starting pitchers 
Note: G = Games pitched; IP = Innings pitched; W = Wins; L = Losses; ERA = Earned run average; SO = Strikeouts

Other pitchers 
Note: G = Games pitched; IP = Innings pitched; W = Wins; L = Losses; ERA = Earned run average; SO = Strikeouts

Relief pitchers 
Note: G = Games pitched; W = Wins; L = Losses; SV = Saves; ERA = Earned run average; SO = Strikeouts

References

External links
1912 St. Louis Browns team page at Baseball Reference
1912 St. Louis Browns season at baseball-almanac.com

St. Louis Browns seasons
Saint Louis Browns season
1912 in sports in Missouri